Thomas Foran (died 18 March 1951) was an Irish Labour Party politician and trade union official. He was a member of Seanad Éireann from 1923 to 1936, and from 1938 to 1948.

He was a member of the Irish Transport and General Workers' Union and served as the president of the Irish Trades Union Congress in 1921. He was first elected to the Free State Seanad at a by-election on 28 November 1923 to fill the vacancy caused by the death of Thomas MacPartlin. He was re-elected for a 12-year term at the 1925 Seanad election and served until the Free State Seanad was abolished in 1936.

At the 1938 and 1943 elections, he was elected by the Labour Panel. In 1944 he was nominated by the Taoiseach. He did not contest the 1948 Seanad election.

References

 

Year of birth unknown
1951 deaths
Irish trade unionists
Labour Party (Ireland) senators
Members of the 1922 Seanad
Members of the 1925 Seanad
Members of the 1928 Seanad
Members of the 1931 Seanad
Members of the 1934 Seanad
Members of the 3rd Seanad
Members of the 4th Seanad
Members of the 5th Seanad
Politicians from County Dublin
Nominated members of Seanad Éireann